Masmouta salad is a salad of Arab salads, served with bread and consists mainly of potatoes, carrots, peas, green gourd and beets as per choice.

See also
 List of Arabic salads

References

Arab cuisine
Salads